Cyclodomorphus is a genus of small to medium-sized skinks (family Scincidae). It belongs to the Egernia group which also includes the blue-tongued skinks (Austin & Arnold 2006).

Species

See also
 Hemisphaeriodon

References

  (2006): Using ancient and recent DNA to explore relationships of extinct and endangered Leiolopisma skinks (Reptilia: Scincidae) in the Mascarene islands. Molecular Phylogenetics and Evolution 39(2): 503–511.  (HTML abstract)

 
Lizard genera
Skinks of Australia
Endemic fauna of Australia
Taxa named by Leopold Fitzinger